Michael Uhl (1944-) is a Vietnam veteran, antiwar activist, critic and academic.

Early life and education
Uhl was born in 1944 and grew up in Babylon, Long Island, New York. He graduated with a BS in Theoretical linguistics from the Faculty of Languages and Linguistics, Georgetown University. He holds an interdisciplinary Ph.D. in American Studies and Writing (Creative Non-fiction) from the Union Institute and University.

Career

In the Army, Uhl served in Vietnam during 1968-69 as a first lieutenant, where he led a combat intelligence team with the 11th Infantry Brigade. After Vietnam, Uhl entered a doctoral program in linguistics at New York University, and became immediately involved in the antiwar movement, joining the New York City based Citizens Commission of Inquiry on U.S. War Crimes in Vietnam (CCI) as a full-time organizer. He helped organize the National Veterans Inquiry and the Winter Soldier Investigation. In 1970, Uhl joined Ed Murphy in exposing the Phoenix Program, testified at the International Enquiry on US War Crimes in Stockholm, Sweden, and in 1971, he was called to testify before a US Congressional subcommittee investigating the CIA's Phoenix Program in Vietnam. He co-authored the first book length treatment on the health effects of chemical herbicides (Agent Orange) on U.S. veterans of the Vietnam War.

Publications
He has authored numerous works within the Antiwar movement. Uhl also authored multiple travel guides, including four for Frommer's Guides.

Film
With Richard Schmiechen, Uhl wrote and co-produced the short documentary film, Nick Mazucco: Biography of an Atomic Vet, on a grant from the Public Broadcasting Corporation.

References
 The work of the CCI, with which Uhl served as a principal, is the subject of Standard Operating Procedure: Notes of A Draft-age American, by James Simon Kunen.
 The work of the Safe Return Amnesty Committee, co-founded by Michael Uhl, is the subject of The Amnesty of John David Herndon, by James Reston, Jr.
 Sworn Congressional testimony by Michael Uhl on the U.S Assistance Program in Vietnam (Phoenix Program).

Notes

External links
 Official website

1944 births
Living people
United States Army personnel of the Vietnam War
American anti–Vietnam War activists
Georgetown College (Georgetown University) alumni
Independent scholars
Pontifical Catholic University of Rio de Janeiro alumni
United States Army officers